Isidora Goyenechea Gallo (1836-1897) was a Chilean industrialist. She owned and managed the coal mines in Lota and Coronel, the silver mines of Chañarcillo, the vineyard Viña Cousiño Macul and had her own trade fleet, and was at the time regarded as one of the richest people in the world. Her house was in the current one Palacio Cousiño in Santiago de Chile. She founded the O'Higgins Park. She inherited her business from her late spouse Luis Cousiño (1835-1873).

References

1836 births
1897 deaths
19th-century Chilean businesspeople
History of mining in Chile
Chilean businesspeople in mining
People from Copiapó
Chilean philanthropists
19th-century businesswomen
19th-century philanthropists